Darrow is a surname of Scottish origin. Notable people with the surname include: 

 Alex Darrow (born 1993), American entrepreneur, founder of PictureTheWorld
 Benjamin Darrow (1868–1911), American district attorney
 Charles Darrow (1889–1967), American businessman falsely credited with inventing Monopoly
 Chris Darrow (1944–2020), American singer and songwriter
 Clarence Darrow (1857–1938), American lawyer and civil liberties advocate
 Clarence A. Darrow (born 1940), American lawyer and politician
 Geof Darrow (born 1955), American comic artist
 George M. Darrow (1889–1983), American horticulturist 
 George P. Darrow (1859–1943), American Republican member of the House of Representatives
 Henry Darrow (1933–2021), American actor
 John Darrow (1907–1980), American actor
 Michael Max Darrow (1960- ) American Author
 Paul Darrow (1941–2019), British character actor
 Sara Lynn Darrow (born 1970), United States District Court judge
 William Darrow, American professor of public health

See also
 Darrow School, an independent high school in New Lebanon, New York, US
 Darrow (comics), a fictional demi-god from the CrossGen Sigilverse
Darrow, the protagonist of the science fiction series Red Rising

Surnames of Scottish origin